Yekaterina Igorevna Tkachenko (born 7 March 1995 in Harare) is a Zimbabwean-born Russian alpine ski racer, a slalom specialist.

References

1995 births
Living people
Russian female alpine skiers
Sportspeople from Harare
Alpine skiers at the 2018 Winter Olympics
Alpine skiers at the 2022 Winter Olympics
Olympic alpine skiers of Russia
Alpine skiers at the 2012 Winter Youth Olympics
Universiade medalists in alpine skiing
Universiade gold medalists for Russia
Universiade silver medalists for Russia
Competitors at the 2015 Winter Universiade
Competitors at the 2019 Winter Universiade
Russian Presidential Academy of National Economy and Public Administration alumni
21st-century Russian women